The Wedding Guest is a 1916 American silent drama film, featuring Harry Carey.

Cast
 Harry Carey
 Olive Carey credited as Olive Fuller Golden
 William Canfield
 Joe Rickson
 Peggy Coudray
 Hoot Gibson
 Neal Hart
 Paul Loring

See also
 Harry Carey filmography
 Hoot Gibson filmography

References

External links

1916 films
1916 short films
1916 drama films
Silent American drama films
American silent short films
American black-and-white films
Films directed by Jacques Jaccard
Films with screenplays by Bess Meredyth
1910s American films